Metropolitan Routes in South Africa, also called Metro Roads or Metro Routes are designated with the letter M, and are usually major routes around cities in South Africa.

East London

Cape Town

Johannesburg

Pretoria

Durban

Bloemfontein

Port Elizabeth

Pietermaritzburg

References 

Roads in South Africa